Warri North is a Local Government Area of Delta State, Nigeria. Its headquarters is in the town of Koko. It has an area of 1,841 km and a population of 137,300 at the 2006 census. The postal code of the area is 332.

Warri North LGA has its headquarters at Koko, a cosmopolitan town that houses a sea port. Conspicuous in the town is the ancient house of Nana Olomu of Itsekiri. The LGA is predominantly riverine and is inhabited by the Itsekiris and the Ijaw People. The major occupations of the people are fishing, carving of canoes, net weaving, hunting, clothes dyeing, trading and farming. It is also the location of a lovely tourist attraction, the floating market at Ogheye. The Local government is richly blessed with Crude oil and houses the Nigeria National Petroleum Company, Chevron amongst others.

References

See also
Warri

Local Government Areas in Delta State